Ring King, known as  in Japan and Europe, is an arcade boxing game. It was published in 1985 by Woodplace in Japan and Europe, and by Data East in North America.

Gameplay
The game continues the series' theme of comical sports as the player takes the role of a boxer who makes his way from his debut to become a world champion. Ring King, though perhaps unintentionally, is standard of the boxing creations of its era, via providing quirky monikers for opponents the player encounters; in its arcade release, these number eight (8): Violence Jo (this entry level fighter is the champion, in the NES version), Brown Pants, White Wolf, Bomba Vern, Beat Brown, Blue Warker (reigning champion, in the arcade version), Green Hante and Onetta Yank. Assuming the player wins the championship, arcade play continues cycling through only the last of the afore-listed three (Blue Warker, Green Hante, Onetta Yank).

The player can choose from several different types of punches and defensive maneuvers, along with unique special attacks. The player revives their stamina during the round interval by pressing the button rapidly. In the Nintendo port, the boxer's abilities are determined by three different stats; punch, stamina, and speed. The player can improve these stats using the power points gained after each match. Performing well in matches allows the player to create more powerful boxers. The player can save their game progress by recording a password, and two players can face off against each other in the two-player mode. Though the game is rudimentary, it is possible to counter-punch, and missing with too many punches causes the boxer's stamina to decrease.

Special attacks
The biggest characteristic of the game is the comical set of special attacks. These moves are activated when the player presses the attack button at the right timing and at the right distance. The attacks have the capability to instantly knock out the opponent, but being countered before a special attack causes an extraordinary amount of damage as well. The first special attack is a powerful hook which the boxer throws by spinning around like a top. The second is a straight punch that propels the opponent into the ropes when it connects. The third type is an uppercut that launches the opponent straight into the air. If thrown at the right timing, the uppercut can blast the opponent straight out of the ring, resulting in a technical knockout.

Ports
The game was later ported to the Nintendo Entertainment System (Famicom in Japan) in 1987, which was published by Namco in Japan and by Data East in North America. This version was also released on the VS. UniSystem as Vs. TKO Boxing. Sony later ported it to the MSX2 exclusively in Japan in 1988. The game was later converted into an i-mode mobile phone application and released exclusively in January 2004 by Namco.

Reception
Ring Kings sales had surpassed 250,000 copies in the United States by 1988, for which it received a Platinum Award from the Software Publishers Association (SPA) in August 1988.

See also
List of boxing video games

Notes

References

External links

Ring King at arcade-history
King of Boxer at arcade-history
Ring King at MobyGames
Ring King at GameFAQs

1985 video games
Arcade video games
Boxing video games
Data East arcade games
Data East video games
Mobile games
MSX2 games
Multiplayer and single-player video games
Nintendo Entertainment System games
Video games developed in Japan